These are the New Territories West results of the 2012 Hong Kong legislative election. The election was held on 9 September 2012 and all 9 seats in New Territories West, which consists of Tsuen Wan District, Tuen Mun District, Yuen Long District, Kwai Tsing District and Islands District, were contested. The Democratic Party suffered a devastating result by losing all two of their seats in the region. The electoral strategy of the Civic Party, the heavyweight Audrey Eu placed second after Kwok Ka-ki in the hope of gaining two seats, produced an extra 70,000 votes but this was still not enough to get Eu into the LegCo. The Democratic Alliance for the Betterment and Progress of Hong Kong split three separate lists in order to avoid wasted votes (see largest remainder method). All three DAB lists were elected.

Overall results
Before election:

Change in composition:

Candidates list

Results by districts

Opinion polling

See also
Legislative Council of Hong Kong
Hong Kong legislative elections
2012 Hong Kong legislative election

References

Elections in Hong Kong
Hong Kong legislative election in New Territories West
2012 Hong Kong legislative election